This is a list of Bangladeshi films that were released in 2001.

Releases

See also

2001 in Bangladesh
List of Bangladeshi films of 2002
List of Bangladeshi films
Dhallywood
Cinema of Bangladesh

References

External links 
 Bangladeshi films on Internet Movie Database

Film
Bangladesh
 2001